The Halifax Peninsula is peninsula within the urban area of the Municipality of Halifax, Nova Scotia.

History

The town of Halifax was founded by the British government under the direction of the Board of Trade and Plantations under the command of Governor Edward Cornwallis in 1749. The founding of the town sparked Father Le Loutre's War. The original settlement was clustered in the southeastern part of the peninsula along The Narrows, between a series of forts (Fort Needham to the north, Fort George (Citadel Hill) in the middle, and Fort Massey to the south) and the harbour. With time, the settlement expanded beyond its walls and gradually encroached over the entire peninsula, creating residential neighbourhoods defined by the peninsula's geography.

From 1749 until 1841, Halifax was a town. After a protracted struggle between residents and the Executive Council, the town was incorporated into a city in 1841. From 1841 until 1969, the entire Peninsula was home to the former City of Halifax.

In 1789, the University of King's College was founded. Roughly thirteen years later, Saint Mary's University was founded in 1802. Subsequently, Dalhousie University was founded 1818. NSCAD University was founded in 1867.

In 1867, the Halifax Public Gardens and Victoria Park, Halifax were created, with many Victorian Era monuments.  Builders such as George Lang created many landmark buildings.

Rudyard Kipling paid homage to Halifax in his poem The Song of Cities:

In 1969, adjacent rural areas within the former County of Halifax (that at this time were beginning to urbanize) west of the isthmus were annexed into the city. The city annexed Armdale, Clayton Park, Fairview, Rockingham and Spryfield.

On 1 April 1996, Halifax County was dissolved and all of its places (cities, suburbs, towns, and villages) were turned into communities of a single-tier municipality named Halifax Regional Municipality. Subsequently, the Halifax Peninsula was included in the new community of Halifax, within the new Municipality of Halifax.

Today, the Peninsula is the bustling region of the community of Halifax.

Geography

Provincial electoral districts
Halifax Chebucto
Halifax Citadel-Sable Island
Halifax Needham

Colloquial neighbourhoods
Convoy Place
Downtown
Hydrostone
Mulgrave Park
North End
Quinpool
South End
Spring Garden
West End
Westmount

Historic neighbourhoods
Africville
Richmond

Stratigraphy
The bedrock of this peninsula is Precambrian slate. Glaciers during the Pleistocene era converted the rock surface to an olive-colored loamy till. Glaciation also removed reddish till from sedimentary rock to the north and redeposited it as a drumlin to form Citadel Hill. The stony loam to sandy loam soils are mapped as Bridgewater series on olive till and Wolfville series on the Citadel Hill drumlin.

Topography
According to the 2021 Census, the Halifax Peninsula covers approximately 1,894.9 hectares (18.949 km2).

Down the length of this isthmus is Joseph Howe Drive, generally considered to be the boundary between mainland Halifax and peninsular Halifax. The Halifax Peninsula creates The Narrows, a constriction of Halifax Harbour to its east.

Parks and Recreation

Arenas
Scotiabank Centre

Art Galleries
Art Gallery of Nova Scotia

Community Centres
Children's Aid Society of Halifax
Citadel Community Centre
Community YMCA
George Dixon Centre
Halifax and Region Military Family Resource Centre
Mi'kmaq Child Development Centre
Mi'kmaq Native Friendship Centre
Needham Pool and Recreation Centre
Olympic Hall Community Centre
Salvation Army Open Arms Centre

Libraries
Anchor Archive Zine Library
Halifax Central Library
Halifax North Memorial Public Library
Left-Leaning Library
Library and Archives Canada Regional Service Centre
Nova Scotia Barristers Library
Vernon Street Community Library

Museums
Africville Museum
Canadian Museum of Immigration at Pier 21
Maritime Museum of the Atlantic
Naval Museum of Halifax
Thomas McCulloch Museum
Museum of Natural History
Sea Turtle Centre

Parks
Conrose Park
Flinn Park
Horseshoe Island Park
Hydrostone Park
Marlborough Woods Park
Nick Meagher Community Park
Fort Needham Memorial Park
Larry O'Connell Park
Peace and Friendship Park
Point Pleasant Park
Merv Sullivan Park
Raymond Taavel Park
Victoria Park
Murray Warrington Park

Pools
Centennial Pool
Dalplex
John W. Lindsay YMCA
Needham Pool and Recreation Centre
The Waegwoltic Club

Trails
Africville Trails
Point Pleasant Park

Demographics
The Peninsula's population grew to a high of 92,511 in 1961--and decreased thereafter. However, in recent years, the population has increased. In 2016, the population was 63,210 people. By 2021, the population increased to 72,169 people--an increase of 14.1% from 2016.

Economy
Being a very populated area, the peninsula hosts many businesses, government services, hospitals, post-secondary institutions, and more.

Transportation
There are many kilometres of avenues, lanes, roads, and streets that criss-cross throughout the Peninsula. The main thoroughfare is Robie Street.

The Halifax Station is operated by Via Rail, and is the easternmost station for the Ocean. The Ocean travels from Halifax to Montreal once per week.

There is a ferry service that runs from Downtown Halifax. It is located at the Halifax Ferry Terminal in Downtown. It connects to either the Alderney Terminal in Downtown Dartmouth, or the Woodside Terminal in Woodside.

Furthermore, Halifax Transit provides many transit routes that traverse the peninsula. There are two terminals located within the area; the Scotia Square Terminal in the South End; and the Mumford Terminal in the West End.

Halifax Transit Routes
Route 1 (Spring Garden)
Route 2 (Fairview)
Route 3 (Crosstown)
Route 4 (Universities)
Route 5 (Portland)
Route 7 A (Peninsula) (clockwise)
Route 7 B (Peninsula) (counter-clockwise)
Route 8 (Sackville)
Route 9 A (Greystone/Fotherby)
Route 9 B (Herring Cove)
Route 10 (Dalhousie)
Route 11 (Dockyard)
Route 22 (Armdale)
Route 24 (Leiblin Park)
Route 25 (Governors Brook)
Route 26 (Springvale)
Route 28 (Bayers Lake)
Route 29 (Barrington)
Route 41 (Dartmouth-Dalhousie)
Route 84 (Glendale)
Route 90 (Larry Uteck)
Route 91 (Hemlock Ravine)
Route 93 (Bedford Highway)
Route 123 (Timberlea Express)
Route 127 (Cowie Hill Express)
Route 135 (Flamingo Express)
Route 136 (Farnham Gate Express)
Route 137 (Clayton Park Express)
Route 138 (Parkland Express)
Route 158 (Woodlawn Express)
Route 159 (Colby Express)
Route 161 (North Preston Express)
Route 165 (Caldwell Express)
Route 168 A (Auburn Express)
Route 168 B (Cherry Brook Express)
Route 182 (First Lake Express)
Route 183 (Springfield Express)
Route 185 (Millwood Express)
Route 186 (Beaver Bank Express)
Route 194 (West Bedford Express)
Route 196 (Basinview Express)
Route 330 (Tantallon/Sheldrake Lake)
Route 370 (Porters Lake Regional Express)
Route 415 (Purcells Cove)

Education
There are many colleges, private-and-public schools, and universities on the peninsula.

Colleges
Academy of Learning Career College
Apex Language and Career College
Eastern College - Halifax Campus
Nova Scotia College of Early Childhood Education
Nova Scotia Community College Institute of Technology Campus

Inclusive Education

The Halifax School for the Blind is administered by the Atlantic Provinces Special Education Authority (APSEA).

Halifax School for the Blind

Private Schools
Armbrae Academy
Halifax Grammar School
Halifax Independent School
Maritime Muslim Academy
Sacred Heart School of Halifax
St. Thomas Acquinas Elementary School
Shambhala School

Public Schools

All public schools on the peninsula are administered by the Halifax Regional Centre for Education.

Citadel High School
École St. Catherine's Elementary School
Gorsebrook Junior High School
Halifax Central Junior High School
Highland Park Junior High School
Inglis Street Elementary School
Joseph Howe Elementary School
LeMarchant-St. Thomas Elementary School
St. Mary's Elementary School
Sir Charles Tupper Elementary School

Universities
Dalhousie University
NSCAD University
University of King's College
Université Sainte-Anne Campus de Halifax
Saint Mary's University

References

Landforms of Halifax, Nova Scotia
Peninsulas of Nova Scotia
Landforms of Halifax County, Nova Scotia